"Clean Town" is the first single by Swedish band Mando Diao from their 2004 album Hurricane Bar and their fourth single overall (not counting EPs). "Clean Town" was released in Japan as an EP, commonly known as the "Japan Tour EP." The EP featured an enhanced section with two live videos from a Japanese performance at the Harajuku Astro Hall. The B-sides, "Hail The Sunny Days" and "Your Lover's Nerve," both later featured again on the Swedish version of "You Can't Steal My Love", the latter also appearing as a bonus track on the Japanese version of Hurricane Bar. The live version of "Little Boy Jr," recorded in Boston, from the Japanese EP has appeared on many Mando Diao releases, including the UK version of "God Knows", the US version of the Paralyzed EP and the German limited edition of "Bring 'Em In".

The song itself is about the band's hometown of Borlänge. It was originally written as praising the town, but ended up sounding more hateful than intended. The song suggests that, instead of leaving, cleaning up the hometown can be another way of escaping. The song is about being proud of where you come from because it will always be a part of who you are. In talking about the song, Gustaf Norén has said "we will always have one foot in Borlänge and [one in] the rest in the world."

Track listings
 Swedish CD
 "Clean Town"
 "Your Lover's Nerve"
 "Hail The Sunny Days"
 Japan Tour EP
 "Clean Town"
 "White Wall"
 "Hail The Sunny Days"
 "Little Boy Jr (Live)"
 "Mr Moon (Live Video)"
 "Paralyzed (Live Video)"

All songs by Björn Dixgård and Gustaf Norén.

2004 singles
Mando Diao songs
Songs written by Björn Dixgård
Songs written by Gustaf Norén
2004 songs
EMI Records singles